David Wyatt may refer to:
David Wyatt (artist) (born 1968), English commercial artist
David K. Wyatt (1937–2006), American historian and author
David Wyatt (politician) (1949–2015), American farmer and politician in Arkansas
Dave Wyatt, Negro leagues infielder and manager